Bageterie Boulevard, is a Czech fast food restaurant chain, headquartered in Prague. The first establishment was opened in 2003 in Dejvice. As of 2020, restaurants in the Czech Republic, Slovakia, Germany and the United Arab Emirates operate under the brand. Baguette Boulevard offers various baguettes, salads, soups and more. Branches are located near office buildings and campuses, or in shopping malls. The brand belongs to the company Crocodille, a Czech company specializing in the production and sale of packaged baguettes and sandwiches, founded in 1991. Bageterie Boulevard has 58 restaurants as of 2022.

Branches by countries

References

External links

 

Multinational food companies
Fast-food poultry restaurants
Fast-food restaurant chains of the Czech Republic